Aanchal Malhotra is an Indian author and historian, best known for her work on oral history and material culture of the partition of India in 1947.

Biography 
Malhotra was born in New Delhi in 1990. She received a BFA in traditional printmaking and art history from Ontario College of Art & Design, Toronto, where she won the University Medal and Sir Edmund Walker Award for Graduate Studies. She completed a MFA in Studio Art from Concordia University, Montréal.

She belongs to the family of Bahrisons booksellers, founded by her paternal grandfather, Balraj Bahri in 1953 in New Delhi. She is also the co-founder of the Museum of Material Memory, a digital repository of material culture of the Indian subcontinent, tracing family history and social ethnography through heirlooms, collectibles and objects of antiquity.

Writing 
Aanchal Malhotra's debut book, Remnants of a Separation: A History of the Partition through Material Memory was published by HarperCollins India in 2017, to mark the 70th anniversary of Indian independence. The project (under the same name) initially began as her MFA dissertation at Concordia University, Montréal, and includes field research in India, Pakistan and England. It is an attempt to revisit the Partition through personal and intimate objects that refugees carried with them across the border during their migration. Written as a crossover between history and anthropology, it details the material culture of the Partition of India. It was named A Hindustan Times 'India @ 70' book and shortlisted for the Shakti Bhatt First Book Award, Kamaladevi Chattopadhyay NIF Book Prize, and Hindu Lit for Life Non Fiction Prize.

Outside the subcontinent, it was published under the title, Remnants of Partition: 21 Objects from a Continent Divided by Hurst Publishers in 2019. It was shortlisted by the British Academy for the 2019 Nayef Al-Rodhan Prize for Global Cultural Understanding.

For the 75th anniversary of the Parition in 2022, Malhotra published a follow up, In the Language of Remembering: The Inheritance of Parition, which focused on the contemporary relevance of the Partition in the everyday lives of Indians, Pakistanis, and Bangladeshis. Her debut novel, The Book of Everlasting Things, also published in 2022.

References

Further reading 

1990 births
Indian women historians
OCAD University alumni
Living people
People from New Delhi
Concordia University alumni
21st-century Indian historians